The Last Warning is a 1938 American mystery film directed by Albert S. Rogell and written by Edmund Hartmann. It is based on the 1938 novel The Dead Don't Care by Jonathan Latimer. The film stars Preston Foster, Frank Jenks, Kay Linaker, E. E. Clive, Joyce Compton and Frances Robinson. The film was released on January 6, 1939, by Universal Pictures.

Plot
Detective Bill Crane and his sidekick Doc Williams are hired by John Essex who has been receiving threatening letters, they are sent to his uncle's country estate to investigate and soon enough his sister Linda is kidnapped.

Cast

Production
In 1937, Universal Pictures made a deal with the Crime Club, who were published of whodunnits. Over the next few years Universal released several mystery films in the series. The Last Warning was part of the series, and the last to feature the sleuthing team of Crane and Doc.

References

Footnotes

Sources

External links
 

1939 films
1939 mystery films
American black-and-white films
American mystery films
1930s English-language films
Films directed by Albert S. Rogell
Universal Pictures films
1930s American films